Spelaeomysis is a genus of crustaceans belonging to the monotypic family Lepidomysidae.

The species of this genus are found in Europe, Northern America, Africa.

Species:

Spelaeomysis bottazzii 
Spelaeomysis cardisomae 
Spelaeomysis cochinensis 
Spelaeomysis longipes 
Spelaeomysis nuniezi 
Spelaeomysis olivae 
Spelaeomysis quinterensis 
Spelaeomysis servatus 
Spelaeomysis villalobosi

References

Crustaceans